The Liaison with Hong Kong, Macao, Taiwan and Overseas Chinese Committee of the Chinese People's Political Consultative Conference is one of ten special committees of the Chinese People's Political Consultative Conference, China's top political advisory body and a central part of the Chinese Communist Party's united front system.

History 
The Liaison with Hong Kong, Macao, Taiwan and Overseas Chinese Committee was created in March 1998 during the 9th Chinese People's Political Consultative Conference.

List of chairpersons

References 

Special committees of the Chinese People's Political Consultative Conference
Organizations established in 1998
1998 establishments in China